This is a list of the ecoregions in Bulgaria - terrestrial ecoregions and freshwater ecoregions as defined by the World Wildlife Fund and the Marine Ecoregions of the World—MEOW global classification system.

Biogeography
Broadly, Bulgarian nature belongs to the Palearctic realm. The freshwater ecoregions in Bulgaria are examples for temperate coastal rivers habitat (one of the twelve major types of freshwater ecoregions) and form part of the Eurafrican Mediterranean Sea Freshwater biogeographic realm. 
The European Environment Agency classifies different parts of Bulgaria as belonging to the Continental, Alpine and Black Sea biogeographic regions.
The Black Sea marine ecoregion is classified as part of the Mediterranean–Atlantic region marine biogeographic realm according to Briggs (1995) or, alternatively, to the Temperate Northern Atlantic marine realm according to the WWF scheme (Spalding, 2007).

Biomes
Apart of being present all the 4 Marine world biomes, the terrestrial biomes that can be found in Bulgaria are: temperate deciduous forest, temperate coniferous forest (Taiga in the mountains), Woodland, Tundra (Alpine tundra in the highest mountains, being Snezhnika glacier (41°46′09″) in Pirin massif the southernmost glacial mass in Europe,) Chaparral or Shrubland in the south-western corner of Bulgaria., and Grassland in Dobruja, which is 6 out of the 9 world terrestrial biomes (according to the classification of the terrestrial biomes proposed by Kendeigh (1961). With a relatively limited territory of 110 993 km2., Bulgaria presents diverse nature with great variety of biomes, habitats and ecoregions, thanks to its peninsular location, varied topography and climate, coasts and rivers. The interaction of complex climatic, hydrological, geological and topographical conditions make Bulgaria one of the most biologically diverse countries of Europe.

This list may not reflect all the relevant information.

Terrestrial ecoregions
 Aegean and Western Turkey sclerophyllous and mixed forests
 Balkan mixed forests (main ecoregion)
 East European forest steppe
 Euxine-Colchic deciduous forests
 Pontic–Caspian steppe
 Rodope montane mixed forests (main ecoregion in the mountains)

Freshwater ecoregions
Temperate coastal rivers
423 Thrace

Temperate floodplain rivers and wetlands
418 Dniester - Lower Danube

Marine ecoregions
 Black Sea marine ecoregion

Gallery

See also

 Geography of Bulgaria
 List of protected areas of Bulgaria

References

 
Bulgaria
ecoregions